Paul Christian Sampson (born 12 July 1977) is an English rugby union and rugby league player who played at wing or full-back for London Welsh, Blackheath, Worcester Warriors, Bath and Wasps, plus Wakefield Trinity and London Broncos

Background
Paul Sampson was born in Keighley, West Yorkshire, England.

Early years
In 1995 Sampson was named man-of-the-match in England Schools' record 30-3 win against Australia.

In the summer of 1996, he won the England Schools 100 metres title in 10.48 seconds, beating Dwain Chambers. In July that year he was called into the England rugby squad while still attending Woodhouse Grove School.

Career
Sampson won his first England cap against South Africa at the end of the 1998 Southern hemisphere tour.  He won two further caps, both against Canada on the summer North America tour in 2001.  All three of his England appearances came on the wing.  He also played Sevens for England.

Sampson most notably played for Premiership side London Wasps between 1996 and 2004, appearing for them in over 100 games, including the victorious 1999 Anglo-Welsh Cup Final. He then played for London Broncos. He later played for five years at Championship London Welsh from 2006 to 2011, again playing over 100 matches.

Personal life
Sampson's long-term partner and wife was Kirsty Gallacher, by whom he has two children, Oscar and Jude. They divorced in August 2015.

He is the cousin of sprinter Denise Ramsden, and former England rugby league international Dean Sampson. Paul's father is Brian Sampson, Malcolm, and Dave Sampson's elder brother.

References

External links
London Welsh profile
Wasps profile
Sampson Signs For Rest Of The Season
Setbacks spur Sampson on comeback trail
Sampson part of the union again
A Hiding to Nothing
Leeds ward off WRU honeypot for Harris
Statistics at rugbyleagueproject.org
Wakefield Harriers - Club Records - Senior Men
2001 Super League Team-by-team guide

1977 births
Living people
Bath Rugby players
England international rugby union players
English rugby league players
English rugby union players
London Broncos players
People educated at Woodhouse Grove School
Rugby league players from Keighley
Rugby union players from Keighley
Rugby union wings
Wakefield Trinity players
Wasps RFC players
Worcester Warriors players